Barolineocerus ornatus is a species of leafhopper native to French Guiana. It is named for the unusual long process on the last segment of the abdomen of the male, which is bifurcated at the apex. It is distinguished from other species in the genus on the basis of the protrusion on the abdomen.

References

Insects described in 2008
Hemiptera of South America
Eurymelinae